Galloway is a region of Scotland.

Galloway may also refer to:

Places

United States
 Galloway, Michigan, an unincorporated community
 Galloway, Springfield, Missouri, a neighborhood
 Galloway, Ohio, an unincorporated community
 Galloway, Texas, an unincorporated community
 Galloway, West Virginia, an unincorporated community
 Galloway, Wisconsin, an unincorporated community
 Galloway Road, Miami, Florida
 Galloway Township, New Jersey

Elsewhere
 Galloway, Alberta, Canada
 Galloway, New Zealand
 Galloway Hills, Scotland

People
 Alexander Galloway (1895–1977), British Army officer in the First and Second World Wars
 Alexander R. Galloway (born 1974), American author
 Beverly Thomas Galloway (1863–1936), American plant pathologist
 Brent Galloway (born 1944), American linguist
 C. M. Galloway (1875–1954), head of the United States Civil Service Commission
 Chick Galloway (1896–1969), Major League Baseball player
 David John Galloway (1942–2014), New Zealand lichenologist
 Don Galloway (1937–2009), American actor
 Drew McIntyre, ring name of Andrew "Drew" Galloway (born 1985), Scottish pro wrestler
 George Galloway (cricketer) (1803–1867), English cricketer
 George Galloway (born 1954), British politician
 Janice Galloway (born 1955), writer
 Jim Galloway (baseball) (1887–1950), baseball player
 Jeff Galloway (born 1945), former American Olympian
 Joey Galloway (born 1971), American football player
 John Galloway (disambiguation)
 Jonathan Galloway (born 1996), Guamanian basketball player
 Joseph Galloway (1731–1803), Loyalist during the American Revolutionary War
 Joseph L. Galloway (born 1941), American Journalist from the Battle of Ia Drang, Vietnam War
 Keith Galloway (born 1985), Australian Rugby League player
 Kevin Galloway (born 1991), American-Iraqi basketball player
 Lee Galloway (1871–1962), American educator, publisher, and organizational theorist
 Langston Galloway (born 1991), NBA player
 Manning Galloway (born 1960), American boxer
 Matt Galloway, Canadian radio personality and journalist
 Michael Galloway (disambiguation)
 Nicole Galloway, American politician, 2020 Democratic nominee for governor of Missouri
 Pat Galloway (born 1957), American engineer
 Paul Galloway (1934–2009), an American newspaper reporter
 Paul Vernon Galloway (died 1990), Methodist Bishop
 Peter Galloway (born 1954), British Anglican priest and historian
 Robert Galloway (1844–1908) Scottish mining engineer and author
 Robert Galloway (tennis) (born 1992), American tennis player
 Samuel Galloway (1811–1872),  Ohio's Secretary of State and U.S. Representative
 Scott Galloway (born 1995), Australian footballer
 Scott Galloway (professor), American entrepreneur, college professor and author
 Steve Galloway (born 1963), English football coach and former player
 Steven Galloway (born 1975), Canadian novelist
 Sue Galloway, American actress and comedian
 Tamara Galloway, British marine scientist
 William Galloway (disambiguation)

Animals
 Galloway cattle
 Belted Galloway, a heritage beef breed of cattle
 Galloway pony, an extinct horse breed

Dioceses
 Diocese of Galloway
 Roman Catholic Diocese of Galloway

Other uses
 Galloway (car), made in Scotland between 1920 and 1928
 Galloway (UK Parliament constituency), a former constituency
 Dr. Ruth Galloway, a fictional forensic anthropologist and the protagonist of Elly Griffiths' novels
 Galloway tube, a component of certain designs of steam boiler
 Galloway's Society for the Blind, an English charity
 The Galloway School, Atlanta, Georgia, USA
 W & J Galloway & Sons, a former British engineering company
Galloways Bakers, chain of pie shops in NW England

See also
 Galway, a city in Ireland

English-language surnames
Scottish surnames
Surnames of Lowland Scottish origin